Charles Dillon-Lee, 12th Viscount Dillon, KP, PC (Ire) (1745–1813) conformed to the established religion in 1767 and inherited Ditchley in England from his mother.

Birth and origins 
Charles was born on 6 November 1745 in London. He was the eldest child of Henry Dillon and his wife Charlotte Lee. His father was the 11th Viscount Dillon.

Charles's mother was the eldest daughter of George Lee, 2nd Earl of Lichfield. His parents had married on 26 October 1744 in London.

He was one of seven siblings, who are listed in his father's article. His two younger brothers, Arthur and Henry, were colonels of Dillon's regiment in France.

Early life 
In January 1766 Pope Clement XIII ended the Catholic Church's support for the Jacobites and recognised the Hanoverian Dynasty as the rightful rulers of England. On 4 December 1767, in Dublin, Charles conformed to the established church. In that same year he was also elected a Fellow of the Royal Society.

Charles, in his youth, liked racing and gambling and made huge debts. He moved to Brussels to avoid his debtors.

In 1770 he was elected MP for the Westbury Borough constituency in Wiltshire, England.

In 1776 Charles changed his surname from Dillon to Dillon-Lee and quartered his arms accordingly to comply with the will of his maternal uncle George Lee, 3rd Earl of Lichfield. In that same year, his mother inherited the Lichfield estate at the death of her uncle the fourth Earl, who died childless.

First marriage and children 
Charles married twice. He married firstly on 19 August 1776 in Brussels Henrietta-Maria Phipps, daughter of Constantine Phipps, 1st Baron Mulgrave and his wife Lepel Hervey. She was illegitimately descended from James II.

 
Charles and Henrietta Maria had two children:
 Henry Augustus Dillon-Lee (1777–1832), succeeded him as the 13th Viscount
 Frances Charlotte Dillon-Lee (1780–1819), married Thomas Webb, Baronet

Lichfield inheritance 
On 4 November 1776 Robert Lee, 4th Earl of Lichfield, died and his earldom became extinct. The nearest relatives of the last earl were his nieces. Charles's mother, née Lee, inherited the estate as she was the eldest surviving of these nieces.

Second marriage and children 
His first wife died in 1782. In 1787 he married, secondly, Marie Rogier of Mechelen. She had been an actress in Brussels and had been his mistress in the time before his first marriage.

 
Charles and Marie had at least three children:
 James William Dillon-Lee (1792–1812), seems to have died unmarried
 Henrietta Dillon-Lee (died 1811), seems to have died unmarried
 Charlotte Dillon-Lee (died 1866), married in 1813 Frederick Beauclerk (1773–1850), a younger son of Aubrey Beauclerk, 5th Duke of St Albans and an early cricketer

Later life 
In 1787 he served as High Sheriff of Mayo, Ireland. On 3 November 1787, his father, Henry Dillon, 11th Viscount Dillon, died and Charles succeeded as the 12th Viscount Dillon. He was solemnly confirmed in the Viscountcy in 1788 by the Irish House of Lords. He was invested as a Knight of the Order of St. Patrick in 1798.

In 1794 Charles inherited the Lichfield estate from his mother. Ditchley became the seat of the Viscounts Dillon. It would remain in the possession of the family until 1934.

During the passing of the Acts of Union 1800 Lord Dillon supported the union.

In 1802 Lord Dillon sold the manor of Quarendon, where the seat of the Lee family had once stood, to James Du Pré of Wilton Park. Quarendon was of course part of the land inherited from his mother. In 1806 Lord Dillon raised a regiment, namely the 101st Regular, recruited from the inhabitants of his Irish lands and surrounding areas near Loughglinn, County Roscommon.

Death, succession, and timeline 
Lord Dillon died at Loughglinn, on 9 November 1813. Despite his conversion, he was buried in the Dillon Family Vault in the Cemetery at the Augustinian Friary, Ballyhaunis, County Mayo, Ireland. His widow died in London in 1833. He was succeeded by his only son, Henry Augustus, as the 13th Viscount Dillon.

Notes and references

Notes

Citations

Sources 

 
 
 
  – Dacre to Dysart
  – Scotland and Ireland (for Dillon)
 
  – (for timeline)
  – (for the subject as MP)
 
 
 
 

1745 births
1813 deaths
British MPs 1768–1774
Earls in the Jacobite peerage
Fellows of the Royal Society
High Sheriffs of Mayo
Knights of St Patrick
Members of the Parliament of Great Britain for English constituencies
Members of the Privy Council of Ireland
Charles 12